"Kisses and Tears (My One and Only)" is a song by the pop group Bad Boys Blue. Released as a single in 1986, it reached number 22 in West Germany and number 26 in Switzerland.

Composition 
The song was written by Tony Hendrik, Karin Hartmann (as Karin van Haaren) and Mary Susan Applegate and produced by Hendrik and Hartmann.

Charts

References 

1986 songs
1986 singles
Bad Boys Blue songs
Songs with lyrics by Mary Susan Applegate
Songs written by Tony Hendrik